Ficus roraimensis is a species of fig tree in the family Moraceae.

The tree is endemic to Roraima state in western Brazil.

It is an IUCN Red List Endangered species.

References

Sources

roraimensis
Endemic flora of Brazil
Flora of Roraima
Trees of Brazil
Endangered flora of South America
Taxonomy articles created by Polbot